Joe Healey (July 25, 1910 – May 16, 1992) was an American hurdler. He competed in the men's 400 metres hurdles at the 1932 Summer Olympics.

References

External links
 

1910 births
1992 deaths
Athletes (track and field) at the 1932 Summer Olympics
American male hurdlers
Olympic track and field athletes of the United States
Place of birth missing